Sveriges Radio AB ("Sweden's Radio") is Sweden's national publicly funded radio broadcaster. Sveriges Radio is a public limited company, owned by an independent foundation, previously funded through a licensing fee, the level of which is decided by the Swedish Riksdag. As of 1 January 2019, the funds stem from standard taxation. No advertising is permitted. Its legal status could be described as that of a quasi-autonomous non-governmental organization.

History

The company – which was founded as AB Radiotjänst ("Radio Service Ltd") by a consortium of newspaper companies, the TT news agency, and radio manufacturing interests on 21 March 1924 – made its first broadcast on 1 January 1925: a relay of High Mass from St James's Church in Stockholm. It was officially renamed Sveriges Radio in 1957.

Sveriges Radio was originally responsible for all broadcasting in Sweden, both radio and television, and hosted the 1975 Eurovision Song Contest. A reorganization in 1979 saw it become the parent company of four subsidiaries:
 (RR), Swedish National Radio;
 (LRAB), Swedish Local Radio;
Sveriges Utbildningsradio (UR), Swedish Educational Broadcasting; and
Sveriges Television (SVT), Swedish Television.

This structure was dissolved in 1993, with the national and local radio companies merging under the name of the old parent company: Sveriges Radio AB.

Stations

National radio 
Four radio channels are available nationwide on FM, DAB and via the internet.

P1: news, culture, debate, readings, documentaries, etc. Almost no music is played, except in the daily summertime programme Sommar, in which guest presenters introduce their own choice of music.
P2: classical music, folk, jazz and world music; the channel also carries some minority-language programming.
P3: popular music and comedy targeted at a younger audience.
P4: popular music, entertainment and sport, chiefly targeted at an older audience; the network is made up of 26 local stations, each of which carries a mix of local and national programming.

Local radio 
A large part of P4's programming is regional with 26 regions each broadcasting their own local programmes during most of the day.
P4 Blekinge, for Blekinge County
P4 Dalarna
P4 Gotland
P4 Gävleborg
P4 Göteborg
P4 Halland, for Halland County
P4 Jämtland
P4 Jönköping
P4 Kalmar, for Kalmar County
P4 Kristianstad, for the former Kristianstad County, now north and eastern Skåne County
P4 Kronoberg
P4 Malmöhus, for the former Malmöhus County, now south-western Skåne County
P4 Norrbotten
P4 Sjuhärad, for Sjuhärad, the south-eastern part of Västra Götaland County
P4 Skaraborg, for the former Skaraborg County, now north-eastern Västra Götaland County
P4 Stockholm
P4 Södertälje
P4 Sörmland
P4 Uppland
P4 Värmland
P4 Väst, for western Västergötland, Dalsland and northern Bohuslän, north-western Västra Götaland County
P4 Västerbotten
P4 Västernorrland
P4 Västmanland, for Västmanland
P4 Örebro, for Örebro County
P4 Östergötland, for Östergötland County

Additional radio stations available locally on FM include:
Din gata 100,6 (in Malmö): playing mostly hiphop and R&B 
SR P2 Musik (in Stockholm): relays most of the output of P2, but replaces programming in minority and foreign languages (available in Stockholm from P6, see below) with additional music output – Schedule
SR P6 89,6 (in Stockholm): broadcasts in minority and foreign languages and relays the BBC World Service at night – Schedule

Digital channels 
Sveriges Radio also provides a number of digital channels through DAB and via the internet.

P4 Plus, plays a broad mix of classic and current popular music (web)
Sveriges Radio Finska, in Finnish and Meänkieli (DAB, web and cable)
Radioapans knattekanal, children's radio (DAB and web)
SR Sápmi, for Sami languages (web)
Ekot, news (web)

SR International 

SR International is the international channel of Sveriges Radio and offers programming in the following languages:

Arabic – website
English – website
Kurdish – website
Persian – website
Romani – website
Russian – website
Somali – website
Tigrinya - website
Ukrainian - website

SR International is not responsible for programming in the domestic minority languages, Finnish and Sámi, which have their own dedicated digital channels.

On 16 March 2010, Radio Sweden announced the end of broadcasts on shortwave and medium wave as from 31 October 2010. External service programmes would continue on the internet only. Language services for immigrants to Sweden in Albanian, Syriac, Serbian, Bosnian, and Croat would also be discontinued, while programmes in English (also on the domestic service), German, Persian, Dari, and Kurdish would remain.

Criticism 
The public's trust in the company, along with its Public Service counterparts in Sweden, may have decreased slightly during the 2000s. The decrease is most significant among right wing citizens.  

In 2022, it was revealed that SR had registered the word ”Sommar”, meaning Summer in Swedish, as a trademark, along with other names related to their show, Sommar i P1, much to the dismay of some podcast operators.

See also 
List of Swedish radio stations
Åke Blomström Award
Modern Times Group (commercial  broadcaster)
Radiotjänst i Kiruna (licence fee agency)
Sveriges Utbildningsradio
Swedish Broadcasting Commission
Teracom (transmitters)

References

External links 

Radio Sweden - Official site 
Sveriges Radio - Official site 
SR International - Official site (multilingual)
Archive of daily podcasts (mp3) 

 
Mass media companies of Sweden
Radio in Sweden
Publicly funded broadcasters
European Broadcasting Union members
Multilingual broadcasters
Mass media companies established in 1925
Radio stations established in 1925
Television channels and stations established in 1956
Swedish companies established in 1925
State media